Gonzalo Macías ( 1509, Calamonte, Extremadura, Castile – ?, Tunja, New Kingdom of Granada) was a Spanish conquistador who participated in the expedition from Santa Marta into the Muisca Confederation that was led by Gonzalo Jiménez de Quesada from 1536 to 1538. He settled in Tunja, formerly called Hunza, as seat of the zaque.

Personal life 
Gonzalo Macías was born around 1509 in the Extremaduran town of Calamonte. He married Juana Moreno de Figueroa, who was also from Calamonte, and the couple had two daughters, Leonor and Juana Macías de Figueroa. His daughter Leonor Macías de Figueroa married conquistador Pedro Luis de Sanabria, who was active in the conquest of Venezuela under Jerónimo de Ortal, and also served under Sebastián de Belalcázar in Ecuador and southern Colombia. Juana married Francisco Salguero with whom she founded the Santa Clara Monastery in Tunja in 1573, the first clarissan monastery for nuns in the Americas.

See also 

 List of conquistadors in Colombia
 Spanish conquest of the Muisca
 El Dorado
 Tunja, Hernán Pérez de Quesada
 Gonzalo Jiménez de Quesada, Gonzalo Suárez Rendón

References

Bibliography

Further reading 
 

Year of birth uncertain
Year of death unknown
16th-century Spanish people
16th-century explorers
Spanish conquistadors
Extremaduran conquistadors
History of the Muisca
History of Colombia
Tunja